Cleiton Oliveira Pinto (born 21 December 1979), commonly known as Cleiton, is a retired Brazilian footballer who played as a midfielder.

Azerbaijan Career statistics

References

External links

Association football midfielders
1979 births
Living people
Shamakhi FK players
Expatriate footballers in Azerbaijan
Expatriate footballers in Portugal
Brazilian expatriate footballers
Brazilian expatriate sportspeople in Azerbaijan
Brazilian footballers